Baumana Street may refer to:
Baumana Street, Kazan
Baumana Street, Lipetsk

See also
Baumanskaya Street, in Moscow